Pietro Giannelli (11 August 1807 – 5 November 1881) was an Italian prelate who was elevated to the cardinalate in 1875.

References

External links
The Cardinals of the Holy Roman Church

1807 births
1881 deaths
19th-century Italian cardinals
Cardinals created by Pope Pius IX